Perucharidius is a genus of ground beetles in the family Carabidae. There are at least two described species in Perucharidius, found in Peru.

Species
These two species belong to the genus Perucharidius:
 Perucharidius andinus Mateu & M.Etonti, 2002
 Perucharidius etontii Magrini & Benelli, 2018

References

Trechinae